Air Marshal Sir Henry Paterson Fraser  (15 July 1907 – 4 August 2001) was a senior commander in the Royal Air Force during the Second World War and in the post-war years.

RAF career
Educated at St. Andrew's College, Grahamstown, South Africa, and Pembroke College, Cambridge, Fraser joined the Royal Air Force in 1927. He became a test pilot in 1934. He served in the Second World War as Officer Commanding the Experimental Flying Section at RAE Farnborough and then as deputy director of War Organisation at the Air Ministry. In this capacity he prepared the early plans for the Normandy landings. He continued his war service on the staff at Headquarters Second Tactical Air Force and then as Commandant of the Aeroplane and Armament Experimental Establishment.

After the war he became deputy director of Policy (Air Staff) and then a member of the Defence Research Policy Staff. He was appointed Senior Air Staff Officer at Headquarters RAF Fighter Command in 1952, Chief of Staff at Headquarters Allied Air Forces Central Europe in 1954 and Air Officer Commanding No. 12 (Fighter) Group in 1956. He went on to be Director of RAF Exercise Planning in 1959, UK Permanent Military Representative at CENTO later in 1959 and Inspector-General of the RAF in 1962 before retiring in 1964.

In retirement he was ordained as a priest.

Family
In 1933 he married Avis Gertrude Haswell; they had two sons.

References

 

|-

1907 births
2001 deaths
Alumni of Pembroke College, Cambridge
Alumni of St. Andrew's College, Grahamstown
Companions of the Order of the Bath
Knights Commander of the Order of the British Empire
Recipients of the Air Force Cross (United Kingdom)
Royal Air Force air marshals
Royal Air Force personnel of World War II